Hitler's Warriors (German title: Hitlers Krieger) is a 1998 six-episode series of German historical documentaries first aired on Zweites Deutsches Fernsehen, created by Guido Knopp and co-created by Jörg Müllner and Henry Kohler. The series looks at six of the most important senior military officers of Nazi Germany in World War II. Profiling these men, the series explores the questions behind "why it all happened".

The senior officers consist of Field Marshal Erich von Manstein, referred to as "the strategist"; Field Marshal Friedrich Paulus, referred to as "the defector"; Field Marshal Erwin Rommel, referred to as "the hero of Tobruk"; Field Marshal Wilhelm Keitel, referred to as "the lackey"; Colonel General Ernst Udet, referred to as "the Devil's general"; and Admiral Wilhelm Canaris, referred to as, "the conspirator".

Overview
Each documentary lasts from 40 to 45 minutes. The series focus on each individual's involvement in the war effort and responsibility regarding crimes committed under their command.

While profiling their military careers, the documentary features statements, comments, criticism, and opinions from their former colleagues and veterans regarding their triumphs or fatal blunders. While profiling their private life, the documentary features personal insights from wives, relatives, friends, and children such as Rüdiger Manstein and Manfred Rommel.

The series also features private family photographs and footage never revealed to the public before, including private visits with Hitler and other top Nazi or military officials.

Episodes

Companion book 
 Knopp, Guido (2008). Hitler's Warriors. The History Press. .

See also
 How Hitler Lost the War
 Soviet Storm: World War II in the East
 World War II In HD Colour

References

External links
 

Germany in World War II
Documentary television series about World War II
1990s documentary television series
German documentary television series
1998 films
1998 television films
1998 documentary films